Sigurður Bjarnason (born 1 December 1970) is an Icelandic former handball player who competed in the 1992 Summer Olympics.

References

1970 births
Living people
Sigurdur Bjarnason
Sigurdur Bjarnason
Handball players at the 1992 Summer Olympics